This list contains some of the most notable students, scientists, lecturer and honorary doctors of the University of Münster (Westfälische Wilhelms-Universität Münster).

Students 
 Johannes Georg Bednorz (born 1950), Nobel Prize winner (1987)
 Kamla Bhasin (1946–2021), Indian developmental feminist activist
 Walter Blume (SS officer) (1906–1974), SS commander and leader of Sonderkommando 7a, part of the extermination commando group Einsatzgruppe B. 
 Lars Clausen (1935-2010), sociologist
 Wolfgang Clement (1940–2020), politician
 Kai Diekmann (born 1964), Chief Editor of Bild, Europe's largest newspaper (3.5 million copies)
 Andreas Raymond Dombret (born 1960), Münster School of Business Administration and Economics; member of the Executive Board of the Deutsche Bundesbank; former Vice-Chairman Europe Bank of America, Director Germany, Austria, Swiss
 Gerd Faltings (born 1954), mathematician, Fields Medal
 Dieter Fenske (born 1942), chemist
 Birgit Fischer (born 1962), athlete
 Monika Grütters (born 1962), politician
 August Hanning (born 1946), President of the Bundesnachrichtendienst
 Gustav Heinemann (1899–1976), politician, former President of Germany
 Matthias Hentze (born 1960), Associate Director, European Molecular Biology Laboratory
  Friedrich Hirzebruch (1927–2012), mathematician
 Thomas Hoeren (born 1961), intellectual property judge and lawyer
 Erich Kamke (1890–1961), mathematician
 Pia Lamberty (born 1984), social psychologist and co-founder of the Center for Monitoring, Analysis and Strategy
 Jens Lehmann (born 1969), footballer (goalkeeper) of the German football team
 Ursula von der Leyen (born 1958), doctor; President of the European Commission
 Wilhelmine Lübke (1885–1981), First Lady
 Niklas Luhmann (1927–1998), sociologist
 Ulrike Marie Meinhof (1934–1976), member of the Red Army Faction
 Gilmar Mendes (born 1955), Minister of Brazilian Supreme Federal Court
 Thomas Middelhoff (born 1953), Board of Directors, Bertelsmann
 Georg Milbradt (born 1945), Minister-President of Saxony
 Walter Momper (born 1945), politician
 Ernst Nolte (1923–2016), historian and philosopher
 René Obermann (born 1963), businessman
 Ruprecht Polenz (born 1946), politician
 Kurt Schumacher (1895–1952), politician
 Rudolf Seiters (born 1937), politician
 Hans-Werner Sinn (born 1948), student, President of the leading Institution for Economic Research (Instituts für Wirtschaftsforschung, IFO)
 Karl Stein (1913–2000), mathematician
 Barbara Stühlmeyer (born 1964), musicologist, writer and contributing editor
 Ludger Stühlmeyer (born 1961), Director of Music ACV
 Hans Tietmeyer (1931–2016), economist
 Klaus Töpfer (born 1938), UNO-Commissar
 Ernst Tugendhat (born 1930), philosopher
 Karl Weierstrass (1815–1897), mathematician
 Harald Weinrich (born 1927), classical scholar
 Marina Weisband (born 1987), politician 
 Oliver Welke (born 1966), author, comedian, voice actor and presenter
 Arthur Wieferich (1884–1954), mathematician
 Heinrich August Winkler (born 1938), historian
 Klaus Zumwinkel (born 1943), former member of the Board of Directors, Deutsche Post World Net
 Jan Kohlhaase (born 1976), mathematician

Scientists and lecturers 
 Wilhelm Ackermann (1896–1962), mathematician
 Kurt Aland (1915–1994), theologian
 Karl Barth (1886–1968), theologian
 Ulrich Beck (1944–2015), sociologist
 Pope Benedict XVI: Joseph Kardinal Ratzinger, (born 1927)
 Hans Blumenberg (1920–1996), philosopher and intellectual historian
 Wolfgang Burandt (born 1957), lawyer, legal academic and professor for commercial law
 Richard Courant (1888–1972), German-American mathematician. 
 Joachim Cuntz (born 1948), mathematician, Gottfried Wilhelm Leibniz Prize
 Max Dehn (1878–1952), German-born American mathematician 
 Christopher Deninger (born 1958), mathematician, Gottfried Wilhelm Leibniz Prize
 Gerhard Domagk (1895–1964), Nobel Prize in Medicine (1939)
 Wilhelm Ehmann (1904–1989), musicologist
 Heinz Gollwitzer (1917–1999), historian
 Jürgen Horst, human geneticist
 Klaus Hildebrand (born 1941), historian
 Joseph Höffner (1906–1987), cardinal of the Roman Catholic Church
 Joachim Jose (born 1961), professor of pharmaceutical and medical chemistry
 Paul Kevenhörster (born 1941), Political scientist
 Wilhelm Killing (1847–1923), mathematician
 Paul Kirchhof (born 1943), jurist
 Johann Kremer (1883–1965), professor of anatomy and human genetics,  served in the SS in Auschwitz concentration camp, convicted of war crimes
Leon Lichtenstein (1878–1933), Polish-German mathematician
 Wolfgang Lück (born 1957), mathematician, Gottfried Wilhelm Leibniz Prize
 Friedrich Mauz (1900–1979), psychiatrist involved with the Nazi T-4 Euthanasia Program
 Johann Baptist Metz (1928–2019), theologian
 Wolfgang Metzger (1899–1979), psychologist
 Klaus Mezger (born 1958), geochemistry, Gottfried Wilhelm Leibniz Prize
 Alfred Müller-Armack (1901–1978), economist, inventor of the social market economy and advisor to the Nazi regime
 Friedrich Münzer (1868–1942), classical scholar, died in Theresienstadt concentration camp
 Frank Natterer (born 1941), mathematician
 Josef Pieper (1904–1997), philosopher
 Heinz Pruefer (1896–1934), mathematician 
 Karl Rahner (1904–1984), theologian
 Bernhard Rensch (1900–1990), biologist
 Helmut Schelsky (1912–1984), sociologist
 Song Du-yul (born 1944), philosopher, former prisoner under South Korea's National Security Act
 Dieter Stöffler (born 1939), planetology, Gottfried Wilhelm Leibniz Prize
 Barbara Stollberg-Rilinger (born 1955), history of early modern Europe, Gottfried Wilhelm Leibniz Prize
 Otmar Freiherr von Verschuer (1896–1969), human biologist and geneticist
 Dietmar Vestweber (born 1956), cellular biology/biochemistry, Gottfried Wilhelm Leibniz Prize
 Hans Wehr (1909–1981), Islamic scientist; author of the Arabian-English dictionary funded by the Nazi Party
 Hubert Wolf (born 1959), history of Christianity/Catholic theology, Gottfried Wilhelm Leibniz Prize

Honorary doctors 
 Jan Assmann (born 1938), (D. theol. h.c. Faculty of Protestant Theology (1998))
 Klaus von Bismarck (1912–1997), (D. theol. h.c. Faculty of Protestant Theology)
 Ernst-Wolfgang Böckenförde (1930–2019), Judge, Bundesverfassungsgericht (2001 Faculty of Law)
 Gilberto Freyre (1900–1987), Ph. D.
 Mikhail Gorbachev (born 1931)
 Tenzin Gyatso (born 1935), 14th Dalai Lama (2007 Faculty of Chemistry and Pharmacy)
 Jean-Claude Juncker (born 1954), Prime Minister (Luxembourg)
 Wim Kok (1938–2018), Prime Minister (Netherlands) (2003 Faculty of Philosophie)
 Hanna-Renate Laurien (1928–2010), theologian (1996 Faculty of Catholic Theology)
 Reinhard Mohn (1921–2009), Director, Bertelsmann (2001 Faculty of Economics (Münster School of Business Administration and Economics))
 Rupert Neudeck (1939–2016)
 Erich Schumann (1898–1985), jurist (2002 Faculty of Law)
 Wolfgang Thierse (born 1943), politician

See also
 Ona Galdikaitė

people
North Rhine-Westphalia-related lists
Munster